This was the first edition of the tournament in the 2015 ITF Women's Circuit.

Anna-Lena Friedsam won the inaugural title, defeating Magda Linette in the final, 5–7, 6–3, 6–1.

Seeds

Main draw

Finals

Top half

Bottom half

References 
 Main draw

Aegon Ilkley Trophy - Singles
2015 Women's Singles